Crystallopsis is a genus of air-breathing land snails, terrestrial pulmonate gastropod mollusks in the family Camaenidae.

Species 
Species within the genus Crystallopsis include:
 Crystallopsis anadyomene (A. Adams & Angas, 1864)
 Crystallopsis aphrodite (Pfeiffer, 1859)
 Crystallopsis balcombei (Cox, 1873)
 Crystallopsis conica Gude, 1907
 Crystallopsis crystallina Clench, 1958
 Crystallopsis debilis Clapp, 1923
 Crystallopsis fictilia Clapp, 1923
 Crystallopsis fulakorensis Clapp, 1923
 Crystallopsis gowerensis (Boettger, 1918)
 Crystallopsis hunteri (Cox, 1872)
 Crystallopsis lactiflua (Pfeiffer, 1861)
 Crystallopsis psyche (Angas, 1870)
 Crystallopsis purchasi (Pfeiffer, 1858)
 Crystallopsis rennellensis Clench, 1958
 Crystallopsis rossiteri (Angas, 1869)
 Crystallopsis tricolor (Pfeiffer, 1850)
 Crystallopsis wisemani (Brazier, 1876)
 Crystallopsis woodfordi (G. B. Sowerby III, 1890)

References 

 Clench, W.J. (1958). The land and freshwater mollusks of Rennell Island, Solomon Islands. Natural History of Rennell Island, British Solomon Islands. 2 (27): 155–202, 4 plates.
 Delsaerdt, A., 2012 Land snails on the Solomon Islands. Volume 2. Camaenidae, p. 178 pp
 Bank, R. A. (2017). Classification of the Recent terrestrial Gastropoda of the World. Last update: July 16, 2017

Camaenidae